The Botswana national football team was founded in 1970 to represent Botswana in association football and is governed by the Botswana Football Association (BFA). It qualified for the 2012 Africa Cup of Nations.

History
It took part in its first preliminary competition for the 1994 World Cup in the United States, where it faced Niger and Ivory Coast. It managed a 0–0 draw with the latter in Gaborone, and lost its other 3 matches, finishing last in its group.

The next competition it entered was for the 2002 World Cup, where it faced Zambia in a 2-legged tie to decide which team would advance to the group stages. Zambia won both legs of the tie to qualify and knock Botswana out. 

After this, Botswana lost 3–0 to Zambia and to second-string sides from South Africa and Zimbabwe at home in Gaborone. A draw with Madagascar which was ranked at 146th in the world at the time, led Botswana FA to sack manager Colwyn Rowe, who lead Botswana to its then-highest ever FIFA ranking of 95th. BFA claimed this move was taken because it feared for his safety from angry fans. Stanley Tshosane was named as his replacement and in his first game in charge, Botswana achieved a 2–1 win away to Mozambique. While achieving a draw with Ivory Coast, Botswana finished bottom of its qualifying group for the 2010 World Cup in South Africa.

Botswana defied its ranking to become the first team to qualify for the 2012 Africa Cup of Nations, beating Tunisia both at home and away. This coincided with a rise to its highest ever FIFA ranking of 53rd. It did not manage to build upon this upturn in form at the tournament, losing more narrowly to Ghana and Mali and more heavily to Guinea to finish bottom of its group with 0 points.

The truncated qualification format for the 2013 Africa Cup of Nations saw Botswana face Mali in a two-legged tie, which Botswana lost 7–1 on aggregate. Botswana failed to qualify for the 2014 World Cup, finishing third in its group with 7 points behind South Africa and Ethiopia.

In October 2013, BFA sacked Tshosane, citing his "failing to meet the targets set for him". It subsequently appointed Englishman Peter Butler in February 2014.

Beating Burundi and Guinea-Bissau in the knockout rounds, it finished last in its qualifying group for the 2015 Africa Cup of Nations with a single point. In its qualifying group for the 2017 Africa Cup of Nations, it finished third - 7 points behind qualifiers Burkina Faso and Uganda. In the qualifiers for the 2018 World Cup, it beat Eritrea in the first round and won 2–1 at home against Mali in the first leg of the second round. A 2–0 win for Mali in Bamako meant that Botswana lost on aggregate and failed to make the group stages.

In July 2017, David Bright became manager of the Zebras for the 4th time after BFA chose not to renew Butler's contract. He led the team during qualifiers for the 2019 Africa Cup of Nations, in which Botswana scored only 1 goal in its 6 Group I matches.

Fixtures

2022

2023

Coaching history
Caretaker managers are listed in italics.

 Thomas Johnson (1973)
 Rudi Gutendorf (1976)
 Peter Cormack (1986–1987)
 Kenny Mwape (1990–1992)
 Freddie Mwila (1992–1994)
 Freddie Mwila (1994–1996)
 Michael Gaborone (1996–1997)
 David Bright (1997–1998)
 David Bright (1999)
 Jeff Butler  (1999)
 David Bright (2000)
 Karl-Heinz Marotzke (2001)
 Veselin Jelušić (2002–2005)
 David Bright (2006)
 Colwyn Rowe (2006–2008)
 Stanley Tshosane (2008–2013)
 Peter Butler (2014–2017)
 Mogomotsi Mpote (2017)
 David Bright (2017–2019)
 Mfolo Mfolo (2019)
 Mogomotsi Mpote (2019)
 Adel Amrouche (2019–2022)
 Rahman Gumbo (2022)
 Mogomotsi Mpote (2022–)

Players

Current squad
The following players were called up for the 2023 AFCON qualification matches against Equatorial Guinea on 24 and 28 March 2023.

Caps and goals correct as of 17 November 2022, after the match against

Recent call-ups
The following players were last called up within the last twelve months.

Player records

Players in bold are still active with Botswana.

Competitive records

World Cup

Africa Cup of Nations

Head-to-head record
As of 18 November 2019 after match against

References

External links

Botswana at FIFA.com
Botswana FA site

1968 establishments in Botswana
African national association football teams
 
National sports teams established in 1968